George Ferguson Goddard MBE (born 19 May 1938) is a former Scottish cricketer. Goddard was a right-handed batsman who bowled right-arm off break. He was born in Edinburgh, Midlothian and educated at George Heriot's School.

Goddard made his first-class debut for Scotland against Ireland in 1960. He played 21 further first-class matches for Scotland, the last of which came against Ireland in 1980. He had entered the Scottish team as a batsman, but as his career progressed he became predominantly a bowler. In 22 first-class matches, he took 41 wickets at an average of 26.86 and best figures of 8/34. These figures came against Ireland in 1972. These figures remain to this day the best innings bowling figures for Scotland in first-class cricket. As a lower-order batsman, Goddard scored 371 runs at a batting average of 13.25, with a high score of 39. He captained Scotland from 1974, having replaced James Brown, until 1980 when he was replaced by Richard Swan.

He made his List A debut for Scotland against Leicestershire in the 1980 Benson & Hedges Cup, a match which marked Scotland's debut in that format. He made 14 further List A matches for Scotland, the last of which came against Gloucestershire in the 1983 NatWest Trophy. In his 15 List A matches, he took 9 wickets at an average of 45.44, with best figures of 2/25. With the bat, he scored 58 runs at an average of 6.44, with a high score of 14.

Outside of cricket, he worked as an accountant. In the 1982 New Year Honours Goddard was appointed a Member of the Order of the British Empire for services to Scottish cricket. In 2011 he was one of the twelve initial inductees into the Scottish Cricket Hall of Fame.

References

External links
George Goddard at ESPNcricinfo
George Goddard at CricketArchive

1938 births
Living people
Cricketers from Edinburgh
People educated at George Heriot's School
Scottish cricketers
Scottish cricket captains
Members of the Order of the British Empire